Chantal Alida Maria de Ridder (born 19 January 1989) is a Dutch football striker, who plays for BeNe League club AFC Ajax as well as the senior Netherlands women's national football team.

Club career
Before signing for Ajax in January 2013, De Ridder last played for Turbine Potsdam in Germany's Bundesliga. She had previously competed in the Netherlands' Eredivisie, winning four titles with Ter Leede and AZ. She scored her first goal for Turbine in the 10–0 2011–12 Champions League home win against Glasgow City.

Due to a long term knee injury suffered in December 2011, she only played seven Bundesliga matches. She left Potsdam in January 2013 and headed back to the Netherlands, intent on getting more match practice and breaking back into the Dutch team ahead of UEFA Women's Euro 2013.

International career
She was a member of the Dutch national team, and played in the 2009 European Championship after making her senior debut on 29 July 2007 against North Korea.

In June 2013 national team coach Roger Reijners selected De Ridder in the Netherlands squad for UEFA Women's Euro 2013 in Sweden.

International goals
Scores and results list the Netherlands goal tally first.

Honours
Ter Leede
 Dutch Championship (1): 2006–07
 Dutch Cup (1): 2006–07

AZ
 Eredivisie (3): 2007–08, 2008–09, 2009–10
 Dutch Cup (1): 2010–11

Turbine Potsdam
 Bundesliga (1): 2011–12

Ajax
 Eredivisie (1): 2016–17
 Dutch Cup (2): 2013–14, 2016–17

References

External links

de Ridder profile on club website

de Ridder profile on women's Netherlands

1989 births
Living people
Footballers from Leiden
Dutch women's footballers
Netherlands women's international footballers
Dutch expatriate sportspeople in Germany
Expatriate women's footballers in Germany
Eredivisie (women) players
Frauen-Bundesliga players
AZ Alkmaar (women) players
1. FFC Turbine Potsdam players
AFC Ajax (women) players
Women's association football forwards
Dutch expatriate women's footballers
Ter Leede players
20th-century Dutch women
20th-century Dutch people
21st-century Dutch women